Piletocera rotundalis is a moth in the family Crambidae. It was described by George Hampson in 1907. It is found in Bali, Indonesia.

References

rotundalis
Moths described in 1907
Taxa named by George Hampson
Moths of Indonesia